Llusca Ritti (possibly from Quechua llusk'a polished; slippery, rit'i snow, "polished snow" or "slippery snow") or Ayachincana (possibly from Quechua aya corpse, chinkana labyrinth, "corpse labyrinth") is a mountain in the Vilcanota mountain range in the Andes of Peru, approximately  high. It is located in the Cusco Region, Quispicanchi Province, Marcapata District, and in the Puno Region, Carabaya Province, Ollachea District. Llusca Ritti lies south of Sullulluni and northwest of Jori Pintay.

References

Mountains of Peru
Mountains of Cusco Region
Mountains of Puno Region